{{Infobox settlement
| name                   = Mare'
| native_name            = مارع
| native_name_lang       = ar
| type                   = Town
| pushpin_map            = Syria
| pushpin_label_position = bottom
| pushpin_mapsize        = 250
| pushpin_map_caption    = Location of Mare' in Syria
| coordinates            = 
| subdivision_type        = Country
| subdivision_name        = 
| subdivision_type1       = Governorate
| subdivision_name1       = Aleppo
| subdivision_type2       = District
| subdivision_name2       = Azaz
| subdivision_type3       = Subdistrict
| subdivision_name3       = Mare'
| parts_type              = Control
| parts_style             = para
| p1                      =  Syrian Interim Government
| elevation_m             = 420
| population              = 16904
| population_density_km2  = auto
| population_as_of        = 2004
| population_footnotes    = {{#tag:ref|{{cite web |title=2004 Census Data for ''Nahiya Mare|url=http://www.cbssyr.sy/new%20web%20site/General_census/census_2004/NH/TAB02-25-2004.htm |publisher=Syrian Central Bureau of Statistics |language=ar }} Also available in English: |name=census2004}}
| timezone                = EET
| utc_offset              = +2
| timezone_DST            = EEST
| utc_offset_DST          = +3
| geocode                 = C1643
| website                 = 
}}Mare' ( Māriʿ, locally pronounced Mēreʿ), also spelled Marea''', is a town in northern Aleppo Governorate, northwestern Syria. It is the largest town and administrative centre of the Mare' nahiyah in the Azaz District. Located some 25 kilometers north of the city of Aleppo, the town has a population of 16,904 as per the 2004 census. Nearby localities include Shaykh Issa and Tell Rifaat to the west, A'zaz to the northwest, Dabiq to the northeast, al-Bab to the southeast, and Maarat Umm Hawsh and Herbel to the south.

Syrian Civil War
Mare' was affected by the ongoing Syrian uprising against the government of Bashar al-Assad. The Ibn Walid brigade of the opposition Free Syrian Army was formed in the town in August 2012.
The Mare' Operations Room was, as well, based around the town.

In January 2015, Mare' was controlled by the Islamic Front. However, the capture of the town of Dabiq in early 2015 by the Islamic State of Iraq and the Levant (ISIL) threatened the town of Mare'. One of the largest towns close to the front-line of ISIL territory, Mare' produced a salient that ISIL attempted to reduce in a number of minor offensives which continued until May 2016.

In February 2016, Russian airstrikes preceded an assault by Kurdish YPG militias, forcing the overwhelming majority of the population to escape. In August 2016, Mare' was reportedly controlled by the FSA. The 2016 Dabiq offensive in September 2016 pushed the ISIL front-line back, removing the imminent threat posed to the town.

References

Populated places in Azaz District